Crossways Halt was a small railway station on the Aberayron branch of the Carmarthen to Aberystwyth Line in the Welsh county of Ceredigion serving the rural area and the nearby estate of Llanerchaeron. Opened by the Lampeter, Aberayron and New Quay Light Railway, the branch to Aberayron diverged from the through line at Lampeter.

History
This halt was opened by the Great Western Railway (GWR) in 1929. The branch was incorporated into the GWR during the Grouping of 1923, passing on to the Western Region of British Railways on nationalisation in 1948. Passenger services were discontinued in 1951, and general freight services ceased in 1963.

Notes

References

  
Great Western Railway Journal Vol 2 No 16 (Autumn 1995)

External links
Railscot on Lampeter, Aberayron and New Quay Light Railway

Former Great Western Railway stations
Disused railway stations in Ceredigion
Railway stations in Great Britain opened in 1929
Railway stations in Great Britain closed in 1951
1911 establishments in Wales